Ian Michael Wells (27 October 1964 – 19 January 2013) was an English professional footballer who played as a forward.

Early life
Ian Michael Wells was born in Wolverhampton on 27 October 1964.

Career
Wells scored 19 goals in 71 appearances in all competitions for Hereford United between 1985 and 1987. 51 of those appearances were in the Football League. He also played non-league football for Harrisons and Wednesfield.

Later life and death
Wells died on 19 January 2013, at the age of 48. He had two sons.

References

1964 births
2013 deaths
Footballers from Wolverhampton
English footballers
Association football forwards
Harrisons F.C. players
Hereford United F.C. players
Wednesfield F.C. players
English Football League players